The Circuit d'Albi is a  motorsport race track located in the French town of Le Sequestre near Albi, about  northeast of Toulouse. Built to replace the nearby Circuit Les Planques public road circuit, Albi has 70 years of history in motor-racing, including the 1951 French motorcycle Grand Prix. It hosted the FFSA GT Championship in 1997, 2002–2011, and 2020–2022.

Notably, it shares its grounds with an active airport in its infield, the Aérodrome d'Albi - Le Sequestre (fr).

Lap records 

The official race lap records at the Circuit d'Albi are listed as:

See also
 Circuit Les Planques, the street circuit in Albi which held the Albi Grand Prix before

References

External links

Albi
Sports venues in Tarn (department)
Sport in Albi